Miguel Ángel Martín (born 1960 in León) is a Spanish comic author and artist. He won the Best New Artist award at the 1992 Barcelona International Comic Fair. Martín is the author of the controversial comic Psychopathia Sexualis (which was banned in Italy).
He has also written many other experimental comics which deal with subjects including dystrophic Cyberpunk scenarios (Cyberfreak etc.) or body horror; his protagonist Brian the Brain for instance features an open skull in which the brain lies visible and unprotected. Other popular publications are Rubber Flesh and Surfing on the Third Wave (publisher: El V%C3%ADbora). 

Besides that Martín has illustrated record covers (Subterfuge Records et al.) and other publications.

List of works 
The following list of works is taken from the artists website and does not include works he did for magazines or illustrations.
 Brian the Brain (La Cúpula/El Víbora)
 RubberFlesh (La Cúpula)
 Keibol Black (La Factoría)
 Kyrie Nuevo Europeo (La Factoría)
 The Space Between (La Factoría)
 Anal Core (La Factoría)
 Snuff 2000 (La Factoría)
 Psychopathia Sexualis (La Factoría)
 Big Whack! (La Factoría)
 Crónica Negra (Midons Editorial)
 Días felices (La Factoría)
 Barny (Gryker & Asociados)
 Atolladero-Texas with script from Oscaraibar (Glenat)
 Cyberfreak (Topolin Edizioni)
 Sicotronic Records (Subterfuge)
 HardON (La Factoría)
 NeuroHabitat (La Factoría)
 Play Love (Rey Lear)
 Surfing on the third wave

Awards 
The  awards are  listed in chronological order.
 Revelation Author Award in the International Salon of Comic (Barcelona 1992)
 International Cartoonists Exhibition; Famous Yellow Kid Award (Roma 1999)
 Great Award "Attilio Micheluzzi" (Napoli, Comicon, 2003)
 Best European Comic Award Romics 2006 (Rome)
 Best comic of the year award XL - La Repubblica (Comicon, Napoli, 2007)

References

External links
Miguel Ángel Martín, information and bibliography (in Spanish)

1960 births
Living people
People from León, Spain
Spanish artists
Spanish comics artists